Woodland Plantation may refer to:

in the United States
 Woodland Plantation (West Pointe a la Hache, Louisiana), listed on the NRHP in Louisiana
 Woodland Plantation in LaPlace, Louisiana; played a role in the 1811 German Coast uprising; birthplace of Kid Ory
 Woodland Plantation (Church Hill, Mississippi), listed on the NRHP in Mississippi
 Woodland Plantation (Carlisle, South Carolina), listed on the NRHP in South Carolina